Commodore Books is the first Black Canadian literary press in Western Canada. Founded in 2006 by Wayde Compton, Karina Vernon and David Chariandy, this press is dedicated to publishing work relevant to black people in Canada.

Adventures in Debt Collection, by Vancouver-based author Fred Booker, is Commodore's inaugural title.  Addena Sumter-Freitag's play Stay Black and Die, an account of growing up black in Winnipeg during the 1950s and 1960s, is Commodore's second title.

The company takes its name from the Commodore, a paddle steamer which transported British Columbia's first black settlers from San Francisco to Victoria during the Fraser Canyon Gold Rush.

External links 
 Commodore Books Web site

Book publishing companies of Canada
Companies based in Vancouver
Publishing companies established in 2006
Literary publishing companies